Robert M. Smith may refer to:
 Robert MacKay Smith (1802–1888), Scottish businessman, meteorologist, and philanthropist
Robert Melville Smith (fl. 1931–1943), deputy minister of the Ontario Department of Highways
Robert Murdoch Smith (1835–1900), Scottish engineer, archaeologist and diplomat
Robert Murray Smith (1831–1921), Australian politician
Robert M. Smith, an inductee from the Canadian Mining Hall of Fame

See also
Robert Smith (disambiguation)